Baima Township is a township under the administration of Dahua Yao Autonomous County, Guangxi, China. , it has ten villages under its administration:
Baima Village
Polou Village
Yongjing Village
Zhonghe Village
Xiahe Village
Liuren Village
Dengpai Village
Keyou Village
Mengdou Village
Tongshe Village

References 

Townships of Hechi
Dahua Yao Autonomous County